Your Piece of the Rock is the debut album by the Los Angeles, California-based R&B group Dynasty (band). Released in 1979.

Track listing
"Your Piece of the Rock" (Dick Griffey, Leon Sylvers III, Foster Sylvers, Ricky Sylvers) 8:03	
"I Don't Want to Be a Freak (But I Can't Help Myself)" (Dick Griffey, Leon Sylvers III, Nidra Beard) 7:20	
"Satisfied" (Dick Griffey, Leon Sylvers III, Gene Dozier) 7:10
"When You Feel Like Giving Love (Dial My Number)"  (Dick Griffey, Leon Sylvers III) 4:36
"It's Still a Thrill" 	(Dick Griffey, Leon Sylvers III) 5:20

Personnel

Dynasty
Nidra Beard, Linda Carriere: Main Vocals
Ernest "Pepper" Reed: Guitars
Kevin Spencer: Keyboards, Vocals
William Shelby: Keyboards, Uncredited Vocals
Leon Sylvers III: Bass, Drums, Percussion, Uncredited Vocal Backing

Additional Personnel
Gene Dozier, Joey Gallo: Keyboards
Ed Green: Drums
Sonny Lewis, Fred Jackson: Saxophone
George Bohannon, Craig Kilby: Trombone
John Parrish, Oscar Bashear: Trumpet
Sidney Muldrew: French Horn
Viola: Brenton Banks, Marilyn Baker, Rolice Dale
Larry Corbett, Miguel Martinez: Cello
Violin: Gina Kronstadt, Haim Shtrum, Harris Goldman, Henry Roth, Jack Gootkin, Jerome Reisler, Jerome Webster, Robert Lipsett, William H. Henderson, Janice Gower (also concertmaster)

Production
Arranged and Produced by Leon Sylvers III and Dynasty
Recording Engineers: Bob Brown, Don Blake
Mixed by Steve Hodge at Westlake Studios
Mastered by Wally Traugott at Capitol Records
All songs published by Spectrum VII Music/Rosy Music, except "Satisfied" (Spectrum VII Music/Rosy Music/Proud Tunes)

Samples
"When You Feel Like Giving Love"
"Altitudes"" by Little Brother (group) on their The Chittlin Circuit album

References

1979 debut albums
Dynasty (band) albums
SOLAR Records albums